Christopher Martin Idle (born 11 September 1938) is a British hymnodist.

Idle was born in Bromley, Kent, and studied at Eltham College, St Peter's College, Oxford, and Clifton Theological College, Bristol. He was ordained as a priest in the Church of England in 1965, and is a member of Reform.

Idle has written more than three hundred hymns. "Eternal light, shine in my heart" has been included in The Hymnal 1982, Together in Song, and Voices United, while "God, we praise you! God we bless you!" is in Christian Worship, Evangelical Lutheran Hymnary, and Together in Song. Other hymns by Idle include "This earth belongs to God", "Spirit of holiness", "When lawless men succeed", "Freedom and life are ours", "Then I saw a new heaven and earth", and "As sons of the day and daughters of light".

Idle has been part of what has been described as a British "hymn explosion" since World War II.

References

1938 births
Living people
People from Bromley
Christian hymnwriters
English hymnwriters
People educated at Eltham College
Alumni of St Peter's College, Oxford
20th-century English Anglican priests
21st-century English Anglican priests